Calohystricia is a genus of bristle flies in the family Tachinidae. There are at least three described species in Calohystricia.

Species
These three species belong to the genus Calohystricia:
 Calohystricia albosignata (Wulp, 1892) c g
 Calohystricia gerstchi Curran, 1942 c g
 Calohystricia velutina (Wulp, 1888) c g
Data sources: i = ITIS, c = Catalogue of Life, g = GBIF, b = Bugguide.net

References

Further reading

External links

 
 

Tachinidae